Identity is the third extended play by the South Korean boy group Victon. It was released on August 23, 2017 with the lead single "Unbelievable" by Plan A Entertainment and distributed by Kakao Entertainment.

Background and release 
The EP contains five songs, including the lead single "Unbelievable", released on August 23, 2017. Victon began promotions for the album with a showcase on August 23 and their performance on M Countdown on August 24. The group's rapper, Do Han-se, participated in the writing of four of the five songs, and Han Seung-woo participated in writing for three songs and he co-composed the lead single.

Commercial performance
The album peaked at number six on the Gaon weekly album chart. By October 2017, the EP had sold 22,145 copies in South Korea. The song also sold 1,096 copies in Japan, ranking number 50 on the Oricon Albums Chart, despite the group not having made an official Japanese debut.

Track listing

Charts

Weekly charts

Monthly chart

Sales

References 

2017 EPs
Victon EPs
Korean-language EPs